Joyce Webster may refer to:

Joyce Webster, character in The Alligator People
Joyce Webster, character in Band of Gold (TV series)